The Masonic Temple in Maywood, Illinois is a building from 1917.  It was designed with Prairie School architectural elements by architect Eben Ezra Roberts.

It was listed on the National Register of Historic Places in 1992.

At some later date, it housed the Maywood Parks and Recreation Dept.

References

Clubhouses on the National Register of Historic Places in Illinois
Masonic buildings in Illinois
Buildings and structures on the National Register of Historic Places in Cook County, Illinois
Prairie School architecture in Illinois
Masonic buildings completed in 1917
Maywood, Illinois